Orhan Hançerlioğlu (19 August 1916, Istanbul – 9 July 1991, Istanbul) was a Turkish writer.

Biography 
Orhan Bali Hançerlioğlu was born in Kırkkilise (Kırklareli). His father, Zahid Bey, is a merchant; His mother, Mrs. Sehavet, is a housewife. In the 1923–1924 academic year, he was accepted to the nursery section of Şişli Terakki High School and started the first school section on February 16, 1925. He attended middle school and high school in the same school. In the records, his name is mentioned as Orhan Bali, Orhan Zahid, and Orhan.

He won the Turkish Language Association Award in 1956 with his novel "Ali". Orhan Hançerlioğlu sang the tales in the broadcast called "One Thousand Nights", which was broadcast on TRT long-wave radio broadcast between 1956-58.

In addition, Hançerlioğlu was the grand master of the Turkish Grand Masonic Assembly between 1966 and 1968.

Bibliography 

 Novel & Story

 Yedinci Gün
 Ali
 Ekilmemiş Topraklar
 Bordamıza Vuran Deniz
 Karanlık Dünya
 Kutu Kutu İçinde
 Oyun
 Büyük Balıklar

 Philosophy works

 Düşünce Tarihi
 Felsefe Ansiklopedisi
 İnanç Tarihi

 Dictionary works

 Felsefe Sözlüğü
 Türk Dili Sözlüğü
 Dünya İnançları Sözlüğü
 İslam İnançları Sözlüğü
 Ruhbilim Sözlüğü
 Toplumbilim Sözlüğü
 Ekonomi Sözlüğü
 Ticaret Sözlüğü

References

Notes 

1916 births
1991 deaths
Writers from Istanbul
Turkish Freemasons